A Woman's Fool is a 1918 American silent Western film directed by John Ford featuring Harry Carey. The film is considered to be lost.

Plot
As described in a film magazine, Lin McLean (Carey), a cowboy, is a fool where women are concerned. He befriends Katie Lusk (Schade), a Denver "biscuit shooter", only to be rejected. Dishearted, he picks up a homeless boy, Tommy Lusk (Pegg), off the Denver streets and makes a pal of him. He learns that the boy's mother is none other than the woman who rejected him. Katy comes back into his life, vowing that she really loves him, but Lin has met Jessamine Buckner (Malone), the new station agent in the small town near where he works, and Lin realizes that she is the right woman. Katy commits suicide and Lin, Jessamine, and the boy start a new life together.

Cast
 Harry Carey as Lin McLean
 Betty Schade as Katie Lusk
 Molly Malone as Jessamine Buckner (credited as Mollie Malone)
 Millard K. Wilson as The Virginian
 Ed Jones as 'Honey' Wiggin
 Vester Pegg as Tommy Lusk
 William A. Carroll as Lusk
 Roy Clark as Billy
 Sam De Grasse as Undetermined Role

See also
 Harry Carey filmography
 List of lost films

References

External links
 
 Wister, Owen, Lin McLean, New York: Harper and Brothers Publishers, 1904 edition, on the Internet Archive

1918 films
1918 Western (genre) films
1918 lost films
American black-and-white films
Films directed by John Ford
Films based on American novels
Lost Western (genre) films
Lost American films
Silent American Western (genre) films
1910s American films